Sindarin is one of the constructed languages devised by J. R. R. Tolkien for use in his fantasy stories set in Arda, primarily in Middle-earth. Sindarin is one of the many languages spoken by the Elves. The word  is a Quenya word.

Called in English "Grey-Elvish" or "Grey-Elven", it was the language of the Grey Elves of Beleriand. These were Elves of the Third Clan who remained behind in Beleriand after the Great Journey. Their language became estranged from that of their kin who sailed over sea. Sindarin derives from an earlier language called Common Telerin, which evolved from Common Eldarin, the tongue of the Eldar before their divisions, e.g., those Elves who decided to follow the Vala Oromë and undertook the Great March to Valinor. Even before that the Eldar Elves spoke the original speech of all Elves, or Primitive Quendian.

In the Third Age (the setting of The Lord of the Rings), Sindarin was the language most commonly spoken by most Elves in the Western part of Middle-earth. Sindarin is the language usually referred to as the Elf-Tongue or Elven-Tongue in The Lord of the Rings. When the Quenya-speaking Noldor returned to Middle-earth, they adopted the Sindarin language. Quenya and Sindarin were related, with many cognate words but differing greatly in grammar and structure.  Sindarin is said to be more changeful than Quenya, and there were during the First Age a number of regional dialects. The tongue used in Doriath (home of Thingol, King of the Sindar), known as Doriathrin, was said by many Grey-elves to be the highest and most noble form of the language.

In the Second Age, many Men of Númenor spoke Sindarin fluently. Their descendants, the Dúnedain of Gondor and Arnor, continued to speak Sindarin in the Third Age. Sindarin was first written using the Cirth, an Elvish runic alphabet. Later, it was usually written in the Tengwar (Quenya for 'letters') – a script invented by the elf Fëanor. Tolkien based the phonology and some of the grammar of Sindarin on Literary Welsh, and Sindarin displays some of the consonant mutations that characterize the Celtic languages. The language was also influenced to a lesser degree by Old English and Old Norse.

The Dwarves rarely taught their language to others, so they learned both Quenya and Sindarin in order to communicate with the Elves, especially the Noldor and Sindar. By the Third Age, however, the Dwarves were estranged from the Elves and no longer routinely learned their language, preferring to use Westron.

Two timelines 

For Tolkien's constructed languages one must distinguish two timelines of development:

 One external, in which Tolkien's linguistic taste and conceptions evolved
 One internal, consisting of the sequence of events within the fictional history of Tolkien's secondary world

External timeline

Tolkien 

Tolkien was interested in languages from an early age, and developed several constructed languages while still a teen. Eventually, as a young adult, he created an entire family of constructed languages spoken by Elves and a secondary world where these could evolve.

One of these languages was created in around 1915, inspired by the Celtic languages, particularly Literary Welsh. Tolkien called it Goldogrin or "Gnomish" in English. He wrote a substantial dictionary of Gnomish and a grammar. This is the first conceptual stage of the Sindarin language. At the same time Tolkien conceived a History of the Elves and wrote it in the Book of Lost Tales. Gnomish was spoken by the Gnomes or Noldoli, the Second Clan of Elves, and Elfin was the other tongue spoken by the great majority of the Elves of the Lonely Isle.

The beginning of the "Name-list of the Fall of Gondolin", one of the Lost Tales, gives a good example of both languages (Gnomish and Elfin):

A few years later, c. 1925, Tolkien began anew the grammar and lexicon of the tongue of his Gnomes. He abandoned the words Goldogrin and lam Goldrin in favour of Noldorin (a Quenya word already sparingly used for his Gnomish tongue). This is the second conceptual stage of Sindarin. Tolkien composed then a grammar of this new Noldorin, the Lam na Ngoluith. In the early 1930s Tolkien wrote a new grammar of Noldorin. This is the "late conceptual Noldorin". At the same time, Tolkien was developing the Ilkorin tongues of the Elves of the Third Clan who remained in Beleriand (those same Elves whom Tolkien would much later name Sindar in Quenya). Noldorin (the Welsh-style language) was at that time conceived as having evolved from the Old Noldorin spoken in Valinor to the many (not Welsh-like) dialects, later called Lemberin, that were spoken in Beleriand. The Noldorin Elves wanted to speak a distinct tongue from the First Clan Elves who also lived with them and spoke Quenya, and so they developed Old Noldorin from what Tolkien called Koreldarin: "the tongue of those who left Middle-earth, and came to Kór, the hill of the Elves in Valinor."

Tolkien created Sindarin in around 1944. He used much of Noldorin and blended it with "Ilkorin Doriathrin" and added in some new features. On that matter, he wrote a side note on his "Comparative Tables": "Doriath[rin], etc. = Noldorin ((?)viz. as it used to be)". The Ilkorin tongues of 1930–50 spoken in Beleriand, e.g. Doriathrin and the other dialects, were not as much based on Welsh as Noldorin was, and Tolkien wanted his new "tongue of Beleriand" to be a Welsh-type language. In Tolkien's words, "The changes worked on Sindarin [from Common Eldarin] very closely (and deliberately) resemble those which produced the modern and mediaeval Welsh from ancient Celtic, so that in the result Sindarin has a marked Welsh style, and the relations between it and Quenya closely resemble those between Welsh and Latin."

Tolkien did not provide a detailed description of the language in published works such as The Lord of the Rings, but he did say that

Tolkien wrote many pieces in Sindarin. He made an effort to give to his Elvish languages the feel and taste of natural languages. He wanted to infuse in them a kind of life, while fitting them to a very personal aesthetic taste. He wanted to build languages primarily to satisfy his personal urge and not because he had some universal design in mind.

Scholarship and fandom 

Two magazines—Vinyar Tengwar, from issue 39 (July 1998), and Parma Eldalamberon, from issue 11 (1995)—are exclusively devoted to the editing and publishing of Tolkien's gigantic mass of unpublished linguistic papers. These are published at a slow pace and the editors have not published a comprehensive catalogue of these unpublished linguistic papers.  Access to the original documents is severely limited as Christopher Tolkien omitted them from his 12-volume The History of Middle-earth. Many new-found words of Sindarin, Noldorin and Ilkorin have been published and the grammar rules of these languages disclosed.

Attempts by Tolkien fans to write in Sindarin began in the 1970s, when the total corpus of published Elvish was only a few hundred words. Since then, usage of Elvish has flourished in poems and texts, phrases and names, and tattoos. But Tolkien himself never intended to make his languages complete enough for conversation; as a result, newly invented Elvish texts, such as dialogue written by the linguist David Salo for Peter Jackson's Lord of the Rings films, require conjecture and sometimes coinage of new words.

Internal timeline 

In Tolkien's words:

Dialects

The divergence of Sindarin (Old Sindarin) begun first into a Northern or  group and a Southern group. The Southern group had a much larger territory, and included  or "Central Sindarin".

So during the First Age, before the return of the Noldor, there were four dialects of Sindarin:
 Southern group
 , the language of Doriath;
   or "West Sindarin", the language of the Falas;
 Northern group
 North-Western dialect, spoken in Hithlum, Mithrim, and Dor-lómin;
 North-Eastern dialect, spoken in Ard-galen (before its ruin), and the highlands of Dorthonion (Taur-nu-Fuin).

Doriathrin 

Doriathrin preserved many archaic features. Unlike the other dialects, it remained free from Quenya influences. The "accent" of Doriath was also quite recognisable, so that after Túrin had left Doriath he kept a Doriathrin accent until his death, which immediately pinpointed his origin to speakers of other dialects of Sindarin. "The post-war 'Beleriandic' as lingua franca and as a language of Noldor was strongly influenced by Doriath." Tolkien set out much about Doriathrin morphology, and how it contrasts with the other Sindarin dialects, in his linguistic writings:

Falathrin 

The language of the followers of the Elf Círdan, called Falathrin (Falassian in English), is the other dialect of the Southern Sindarin group. It remained close to the tongue of Doriath because there was great trade between the two groups up to the time of the Wars of Beleriand.

North Sindarin 

It differed from the Central Sindarin of Beleriand in many aspects. Originally spoken in Dorthonion and Hithlum, it contained many unique words and was not fully intelligible to the other Elves. The Northern dialect was in many ways more conservative, and later divided itself into a North-Western dialect (Hithlum, Mithrim, Dor-lómin) and a North-Eastern dialect (the highlands of Taur-nu-Fuin, and the wide plains of Ard-galen to the north of the highlands). This language was at first adopted by the exiled Noldor after their return to Middle-earth at Losgar. Later Noldorin Sindarin changed, much owing to the adoption of Quenya features, and partially because of to the love of the Noldor for making linguistic changes. Beren's heritage was clear to Thingol of Doriath as he spoke the North Sindarin of his homeland.

Noldorin Sindarin 

With the exception of Doriathrin, Sindarin adopted some Quenya features after the return of the Noldor, as well as unique sound changes devised by the Noldor (who loved changing languages):

In the hidden city of Gondolin, an isolated land, a peculiar dialect developed: "This differed from the standard (of Doriath) (a) in having Western and some Northern elements, and (b) in incorporating a good many Noldorin-Quenya words in more a less Sindarized forms. Thus the city was usually called Gondolin (from Q. ) with simple replacement of g-, not Goenlin or Goenglin [as it would have been in standard Sindarin]".

In the Second and Third Age 

'Beleriandic' Sindarin as a lingua franca of all Elves and many Men, and as the language of the Noldor in exile, was based on Western Sindarin but was strongly influenced by Doriathrin. During the Second Age Sindarin was a lingua franca for all Elves and their friends (thus it was used to inscribe the West-gate of Moria), until it was displaced for Men by Westron, which arose in the Third Age as a language heavily influenced by Sindarin. In Gondor at the end of the Third Age, Sindarin was still spoken daily by a few noble Men in the city Minas Tirith. Aragorn, raised in the safety of the Elvish stronghold of Rivendell, spoke it fluently.

Phonology 

Sindarin was designed with a Welsh-like phonology. 
Stress is as in Latin: on the penult if that is heavy (a closed syllable, long vowel or diphthong) and on the antepenult if the penult is light.

Consonants 

The sound  is written  when final (alph, "swan") or when used to spell a lenited  (i-pheriannath, "the halflings") which becomes . Old Sindarin, like Common Brittonic and Old Irish, also had a spirant m or nasal v, which was transcribed as mh.

Orthographic conventions

Vowels

Monophthongs 

An acute signifies a long vowel (á, é, etc.). In a monosyllabic word, a circumflex is used (â, ê, etc.). 

In Old Sindarin, there was a vowel similar to German ö, which Tolkien mostly transcribed as œ. Although this was meant to be distinct from the diphthong oe, it was often simply printed oe in publications like The Silmarillion, e.g.  (read: Nírnaeth Arnœdiad),  (read: Gœlydh). This vowel later came to be pronounced  and is therefore transcribed as such (e.g. Gelydh).

Diphthongs 

Diphthongs are ai (pronounced like aisle [aɪ]), ei (day [ɛɪ]), ui (ruin [ʊɪ]), and au (cow [aʊ]). If the last diphthong finishes a word, it is spelt aw. There are also diphthongs ae and oe with no English counterparts, similar to pronouncing a or o respectively in the same syllable as one pronounces an e (as in pet); IPA . Tolkien had described dialects (such as Doriathrin) and variations in pronunciations (such as that of Gondor), and other pronunciations of ae and oe undoubtedly existed.

Grammar 

Tolkien wrote that he gave Sindarin "a linguistic character very like (though not identical with) British-Welsh ... because it seems to fit the rather 'Celtic' type of legends and stories told of its speakers".

Unlike the largely agglutinative Quenya, Sindarin is mainly a fusional language with some analytic tendencies. It can be distinguished from Quenya by the rarity of vowel endings, and the use of voiced plosives b d g, rare in Quenya found only after nasals and liquids. Yrch. Sindarin forms plurals in multiple ways.

Nouns 

While Sindarin does not have a grammatical gender, it has like Welsh two systems of grammatical number.  Singular/plural nouns correspond to the singular/plural number system just as of English. Sindarin noun plurals are unpredictable and formed in several ways.

Some Sindarin (and Noldorin) nouns of one syllable form the plural with an ending (usually -in), e.g. , pl. "wild men, Woses, Púkel-Men". , "Dark-Elves". Still others form their plurals through some combination of the two, and a few do not change in the plural: , "Beleriandic-Elf/Elves" is singular and plural.

The other system of number was called by Tolkien 2nd plural or collective number. Another ending of the 2nd pl. is -rim, used especially to indicate a race-group:  "the race of the Dwarves", from pl. (sg. , "Dwarf").

The endings -rim, -hoth, and waith, Sindarin words meaning 'multitude', 'host', and 'people' respectively, are added to a singular noun to form a 2nd plural, e. g.  "the Werewolf-horde" from  "Were-wolf";  "wolvish folk".

Plural forms 

Most Sindarin plurals are formed by vowel change and are characterised by i-mutation. The Noldorin term for this is prestanneth "affection of vowels". In an earlier stage of the language, plurals were marked by the suffix -ī, to which the root  assimilated, becoming fronted (and raised if low); later the final -ī was lost, leaving the changed root  as the sole marker of the plural. The resulting plural patterns are:

 In non-final syllables:
 a > e –  (tree) >  (trees)
 e > e –  (queen) >  (queens)
 o > e –  (female dwarf) >  (female dwarves) (originally became œ, which later became e)
 u > y –  (poplar tree) >  (poplar trees)
 In final syllables:
 a with one consonant following > ai –  (king) >  (kings)
 a with consonant cluster following #1 > e –  (saga) >  (sagas)
 a with consonant cluster following #2 > ai –  (outline, shape)>  (outlines, shapes)(nasal & plosive)
 a with consonant cluster following #3 > ei –  (swan) >  (swans) (liquid & fricative)
 â > ai –  (foot) >  (feet)
 e > i –  (mortal woman) >  (mortal women)
 ê > î –  (child) >  (children)
 o > y –  (lord) >  (lords)
 o > e –  (mountain) >  (mountains) (in some cases)
 ó > ý –  (steadfast man) >  (steadfast men)
 ô > ŷ –  (pine tree) >  (pine trees)
 u > y –  (monster>  (monsters)
 û > ui –  (dog) >  (dogs)
 au > oe –  (dwarf)>  (dwarves) (cf. German au > äu)
 aea > ei –  (sea) >  (seas) (presumably changed further to air as is common at the end of Sindarin words; "a" actually changes to "ei" before "ai")

Initial consonant mutations 

Sindarin has a series of consonant mutations, varying between dialects as follows.

Mutations found in Noldorin 

The mutations of "early conceptual Noldorin" are defined in Tolkien's Lam na Ngoluith, Early Noldorin Grammar.

Mutation is triggered in various ways:

 Soft mutation is triggered by a closely connected word ending in a vowel; the consonant then assumes the form it should have medially.
 Hard mutation is due to the gemination of an original initial consonant because of precedence of a closely connected word ending in a plosive.
 Nasal mutation is due to a preceding nasal.

The following table outlines how different consonants are affected by the three mutations.

The apostrophe ’ indicates elision, and is not necessarily written. Those forms of lenited p that are pronounced f are written ph as mentioned above. 

Noldorin words beginning in b-, d-, or g-, which descend from older mb-, nd-, or ng- are affected differently by the mutations:

Many of the mutations of Noldorin were taken into Sindarin a few years later. The Sindarin word gwath "shadow" becomes i 'wath, "the shadow".

Mutations found in Salo's grammar 

David Salo's A Gateway to Sindarin proposes a more complex set of mutations, based on extrapolation from the Sindarin corpus, as follows (empty cells indicate no change):

The nasal mutation however does not affect 'd' and 'g' when found in the clusters 'dr', 'gr', 'gl' or 'gw'. By Salo's admission, the liquid mutation is speculative and not attested in Tolkien's writings at the time he wrote A Gateway to Sindarin.

Pronouns 

One source is used for the Sindarin pronouns, another for the possessive suffixes.

These are subjective forms used in conjugation. Sindarin used objective detached forms, like dhe (2nd pers. formal/polite singular).

Sindarin pronouns could combine with prepositions as in Celtic languages, Welsh:  "to/for us" from  'to/for' and  'we/us'.  annin "for/to me". The first person singular pronoun suffixes could combine with nouns: Lamm, "tongue" > lammen "my tongue".

Verbs 

Tolkien wrote that Quenya inflections were pretty regular, but that "Sindarin verbal history is complicated." About -ant, the 3rd person past tense ending of Sindarin, he wrote: "it is rather like that of Medieval Welsh -as, or modern Welsh [3p sing.] -odd." So with  "make marks of signs, write, inscribe",  is the 3rd person singular past tense. Cf. Welsh , "he played" (<  'to play' +  and  'he'). -ant is the Welsh 3p plural ending:  'they (will) play'.

Basic verbs 

The infinitive is not used as a noun; the gerund is used instead.

The third person singular, because it has a zero-ending, does not require the insertion of -i.

The past tense of basic verbs is very complicated and poorly attested. One common reconstructed system is to use -n: . However, the only time this -n actually remains is after a stem in -r. After a stem ending in -l, -n becomes -ll: . After -b, -d, -g, -v, or -dh, it is metathesized and then assimilated to the same place of articulation as the consonant it now precedes. The consonant then experiences what could be called a "backwards mutation": -b, -d, and -g become -p, -t, and -c, and -v and -dh become -m and -d. The matter is complicated even further when pronominal endings are added. Because -mp, -mb, -nt, -nd, and -nc did not survive medially, they become -mm-, -mm-, -nn-, -nn-, and -ng. In addition, past tense stems in -m would have -mm- before any pronominal endings. These examples show the transformations step-by-step:

 cab- > **cabn > **canb > **camb > camp, becoming camm- with any pronominal endings.
 ped- > **pedn > **pend > pent, becoming penn- with any pronominal endings.
 dag- > **dagn > **dang (n pronounced as in men) > **dang (n pronounced as in sing) > danc, becoming dang- with any pronominal endings.
 lav- > **lavn > **lanv > **lanm > **lamm > lam, becoming lamm- before any pronominal endings.
 redh- > **redhn > **rendh > **rend > rend, becoming renn- before any pronominal endings.

The future tense is formed by the addition of -tha. An -i is also inserted between the stem and -tha, which again causes a and o to umlaut to e. Endings for all persons except for the first person singular can be added without any further modification: , .

Vocabulary 

As of 2008, about 25 thousand Elvish words have been published.

The Lexicons of Gnomish, Noldorin and Sindarin lack modern vocabulary (television, motor, etc.). Tolkien fans have extended Sindarin to enable it to be spoken.

Numerals 

According to Tolkien, the elves preferred duodecimal counting (base 12) to the Dunedain's decimal system (base 10: Quenya maquanotië, *quaistanótië), though the two systems seem to have coexisted. The numbers 1–12 are presented below (reconstructed forms are marked with an asterisk *), as well as a few higher numbers.

The word * is extracted from the name Menegroth, "the Thousand Caves", although this could technically be a base-12 "thousand" (i.e., 123 or 1,728).

References

Primary 

This list identifies each item's location in Tolkien's writings.

Secondary

Sources 

 Bellet, Bertrand. "Noldorin Plurals in the Etymologies." Tengwestië (2005).
 
 Derzhanski, Ivan A. "Peth i dirathar aen: Some Notes on Eldarin Relative Constructions." Vinyar Tengwar 38 (1997): 9–13, 18.
 
 Gilson, Christopher. "Gnomish is Sindarin: The Conceptual Evolution of an Elvish Language." In Tolkien's Legendarium: Essays on the History of Middle-earth, edited by Verlyn Flieger and Carl F. Hostetter, 95-104. Westport, Connecticut: Greenwood, 2000.
 
 Hemmi, Yoko. "Tolkien's The Lord of the Rings and His Concept of Native Language: Sindarin and British-Welsh." Tolkien Studies (2010): 147–74.
 
 Hostetter, Carl F. "The 'King's Letter': An Historical and Comparative Analysis." Vinyar Tengwar 31 (1993): 12–34.
 Hostetter, Carl F.  "The Past-Tense Verb in the Noldorin of the Etymologies." Tengwestië (2003).
 Hostetter, Carl F. "I Lam na Ngoldathon: The Grammar and Lexicon of the Gnomish Tongue." In J. R. R. Tolkien Encyclopedia: Scholarship and Critical Assessment, ed. Michael D.C. Drout, pp. 291–92. New York: Routledge, 2007.
 Hostetter, Carl F. "The Two Phonetic Values of ll in Elvish Sindarin in the Lord of the Rings" Tengwestië (2003).
 
 Marmor, Paula, Laurence Krieg, and David Strecker. "Initial Consonant Mutation in Celtic and Sindarin." Parma Eldalamberon 4 (1974): 12–16.
 Martínez, Helios De Rosario. "Light and Tree: A Survey Through the External History of Sindarin." Tengwestië (2005).
 
 
 
 
 
 
 Welden, Bill. "On the Formation of Plurals in Sindarin." Parma Eldalamberon 1, no. 1 (1971): 10–11.

External links 

 English <=> Sindarin translation online
 Thorsten Renk's page on Elvish Languages
 Thorsten Renk's Pedin Edhellen: a Sindarin-Course (gz archive)
 Ardalambion, Helge Fauskanger's site on Tolkien's languages
 Helge Fauskanger's page on Sindarin
 R. R.vf.com/hisweloke/sindar/ Hisweloke's Sindarin dictionary project
 Hesperides (Dragon Flame port for Mac OS X)

Fusional languages
Middle-earth languages
 
Constructed languages
Constructed languages introduced in the 1940s